Ann Brill is the Dean of the School of Journalism at the University of Kansas.

Career
Brill focuses her research work on how journalists are affected by the changes in media technology. Through her research, she has found that the developments in media technology have forced journalists to become adaptive and flexible in the ways that they work in turn causing them to be lifelong learners.

Awards
Nominated for University of Missouri Provost Outstanding Junior Faculty Teaching Award
School of Journalism, 1996 and 1997
Outstanding Faculty Member, University of Missouri Panhellic Council, 1997
Profiled in University of Minnesota School of Journalism and Mass Communication Alumni Publication, 1995 Research

Education

B.A.  Journalism, University of Wisconsin-Eau Claire 
M.A.  Journalism, Marquette University 
Ph.D. Mass Communications, University of Minnesota

References

Marquette University alumni
University of Minnesota School of Journalism and Mass Communication alumni
University of Wisconsin–Eau Claire alumni
Living people
University of Kansas faculty
Year of birth missing (living people)